This is the discography of Magic, an American hip hop recording artist.

Albums

Studio albums

Collaborative albums
Body Head Bangerz: Volume One (with Body Head Bangerz)
Released: August 3, 2004 (Original release)October 26, 2004 (Universal release)
Label: Body Head Entertainment, Universal
Chart positions: #12 (Top Heatseekers),#38 (Top R&B/Hip-Hop Albums)
U.S. sales: -
Last RIAA Certification: None
Singles: "Can't Be Touched", "I Smoke, I Drank"

Singles

As lead artist
1998: "Did What I Had 2'" (feat. Mystikal)
1998: "9th Ward"
1999: "That's Me"
1999: "Ice On My Wrist" (feat. Master P)
2002: "What"
2003: "9th Ward'"
2003: "Tear It Up'"
2003: "War" (feat. Trouble)
2003: "Wylin'"
2003: "International Gangstas" (feat. Curren$y)
2005: "Let's Roll" (feat. 8ball & David Banner)
2005: "Me and My Dogs"
2006: "Shorty" (feat. Detroit)
2010: "Bitch You Must Be Crazy"
2010: "I'm Done"
2011: "Rollin" (feat. Campaign Brooks)
2012: "Like Beyonce" (feat. Level & Young Ready)

As featured singles
2004: "Can't Be Touched" (Body Head Bangerz featuring Trouble Tha Truth)
2004: "I Smoke, I Drank" (Body Head Bangerz featuring YoungBloodZ)
2004: "You Know My Kind" (Body Head Bangerz featuring B.G.)
2006: "Push Back" (New Orleans Finest)
2012: "See Wut Dat Do!" (SESS 4-5)

Other songs

Solo
----: "Diss To Master P (Nigga U Owe Me FUCK NO LIMIT 1)"
1998: "Heaven 4 A Thug" (feat. Mac & C-Murder)
1999: "You Ain't a Baller"
2001: "Dirty Dee" (feat. Master P)
2001: "Incarcerated" (feat. Blaxuede & Fiend)
2003: "This For My"
2004: "Push Em Of" (feat. Chyna Whyte)
2008: "Da Lou Swag" (feat. Hurricane Chris & Big Poppa)
2010: "I Wish"
2010: "112" (feat. T-Pain)
2011: "In This Bitch"
2011: "My Thang"

Featured
????: "I Smoke, I Drank (Remix)" (Raw Boyz)
????: "7th Ward Soulja" (The Beat Doctor)
????: "Hate Me" (The Beat Doctor feat. Tricky & Greedi)
1998: "Buck 'Em" (Big Ed feat. Fiend)
1998: "Picture Me" (C-Murder)
1998: "Real Niggaz Gon Ride" (C-Murder)
1998: "Watch You Enemies" (C-Murder)
1998: "Dying in My City" (C-Murder feat. Snoop Dogg)
1998: "Do You Wanna Be A Rider" (Fiend feat. Prime Suspects)
1998: "So Much Drama" (Gambino Family feat. 2-4-1)
1998: "Don't Cry" (Gambino Family feat. Fiend, Gotti, QB & C-Murder)
1998: "Blood Line" (Ghetto Commission)
1998: "Our Thing" (Ghetto Commission feat. Mac)
1998: "Throw Them Thangs" (Kane & Abel)
1998: "Nobody Make A Sound" (Mac feat. 2-4-1 & Fiend)
1998: "Meet Me At The Hotel" (Mac feat. Mr. Serv-on, Storm & Mo B. Dick)
1998: "Let's Get 'Em" (Master P feat. C-Murder)
1998: "We Got It" (Mr. Serv-On feat. Big Ed & Fiend)
1998: "No Limit Soldiers II" (No Limit Soldiers)
1998: "N.L. Party" (Soulja Slim feat. Master P, Silkk The Shocker, Full Blooded, Tre-Nitty, Gambino Family, Big Ed, Prime Suspects, Mac, Kane & Abel & Snoop Dogg)
1998: "Plead My Case" (Steady Mobb'n)
1999: "Ride On Dem Bustas" (C-Murder feat. Mr. Serv-On)
1999: "I Remember" (C-Murder feat. Porsha)
1999: "Can't Hold Me Back" (C-Murder feat. Q.B.)
1999: "Closin' Down Shop" (C-Murder feat. Soulja Slim)
1999: "Been Thru It All" (Fiend)
1999: "We Riderz" (Lil Italy)
1999: "Soulja Style" (Lil Soldiers)
1999: "Bloody" (Mac)
1999: "War Party" (Mac feat. D.I.G.)
1999: "That's Hip Hop" (Mac feat. Sugar, Renior, Donald XL Robertson & Samm)
1999: "Ghetto Prayer" (Master P)
1999: "Ice On My Wrist (Remix)" (Master P)
1999: "Nobody Moves" (Master P)
1999: "Ain't Nothing Changed" (Master P feat. D.I.G.)
1999: "Foolish" (Master P feat. Mo B. Dick)
1999: "Bonnie & Clyde" (Mercedes)
1999: "Part 3" (Mo B. Dick feat. C-Murder & Mia X)
1999: "Murder" (Mr. Serv-On)
1999: "Straight Outta N.O." (Mr. Serv-On feat. C-Murder)
1999: "Hail Mary" (TRU)
1999: "Soldier Till I Die" (TRU feat. D.I.G.)
2000: "No Limit" (504 Boyz)
2000: "Whodi" (504 Boyz)
2000: "Wobble Wobble" (504 Boyz)
2000: "Damned If They Murder Me" (C-Murder feat. Mac & MS. Peaches)
2000: "I Won't Stop" (C-Murder)
2000: "Street Thugs" (C-Murder feat. New-9)
2000: "Down 4 My Niggas" (C-Murder feat. Snoop Dogg)
2000: "Pockets Gone' Stay Fat" (Master P)
2000: "Back Up Off Me" (Snoop Dogg feat. Master P)
2002: "Holla" (504 Boyz)
2002: "I Gotta Whare That There" (504 Boyz)
2002: "Tight Whist" (504 Boyz)
2003: "Say It 2 My Face" (Boo)
2003: "Oh No" (Choppa, Krazy, Magic & T-Bo)
2003: "Dirty South" (Soulja Slim)
2004: "It's Whatever (Remix)" (Beelow feat. Juvenile, Plaboy & Lil Josh)
2004: "Can't Be Touched (Remix)" (Body Head Bangerz feat. Trouble Tha Truth, Remy Ma & Tiatsh)
2004: "My Lady" (Detroit)
2004: "No Rush" (Detroit)
2004: "Down Here (Remix)" (Sean Paul feat. Lil' Boosie & Soulja Slim)
2005: "Slugged Up" (Choppa)
2005: "Blocka Blocka" (Chyna Whyte)
2005: "Ain't Got Nothing" (David Banner feat. Lil' Boosie)
2005: "Ain't Got Nothin' (Trunk In Da Club Remix)" (David Banner feat. Lil' Boosie & DJ CASPER)
2005: "We Bring Pain" (S.T.E.E.L.)
2006: "Fuck Dat Nigga" (Chill feat. Clay 2 Da Jay)
2008: "I Smoke, I Drink (Remix) (Dissing Chamillionaire)" (Mike Jones)
2008: "He's Coming" (V.A.N.T. feat. John Jack)
2009: "From The Bottom" (C-Murder feat. Detroit & Skip)
2010: "Head Up" (C-Murder)
2011: "Hit Louisiana" (Young Chetta feat. Brooks)
2011: "Love My City" (Merk)
2011: "Blow My High" (Raw Boyz)
2012: "Beauty" (Detroit)
2012: "Niggas Ain't Shit" (Level feat. Spitta)

Video

Music video
1998: "No Hope" (Magic feat. C-Murder, Lady TRU & Sons of Funk)
1999: "Talk It Like I Bring It bw Mr. Whomp Whomp" (Fiend)
1999: "War Party" (Mac feat. Magic & D.I.G.)
1999: "That's Me" (Magic)
1999: "Ice On My Wrist" (Magic feat. Master P)
1999: "Foolish" (Master P feat. Magic & Mo B. Dick)
2000: "Whodi" (504 Boyz)
2000: "Wobble Wobble" (504 Boyz)
2000: "Down 4 My Niggas" (C-Murder feat. Snoop Dogg & Magic)
2000: "Pockets Gone' Stay Fat" (Master P feat. Magic)
2002: "What" (Magic)
2003: "Tight Whips" (504 Boyz)
2004: "Can't Be Touched" (Body Head Bangerz featuring Trouble Tha Truth)
2004: "I Smoke, I Drank" (Body Head Bangerz featuring YoungBloodZ)
2005: "Black Saturday" (Jazz, Ramp & Boosie Red)
2005: "Ain't Got Nothing" (David Banner feat. Magic & Lil' Boosie)
2011: "Love My City" (Merk feat. Magic)
2011: "Hit Louisiana" (Young Chetta feat. Magic & Brooks)
2012: "Gold Mouth Dawg (Remix)" (Foxx feat. Magic)
2012: "Like Beeyonce" (Magic feat. Level & Young Ready)
2013: "Blow My High" (The Beat Doctor feat. Ay Bay Bay, Juvenile, Magic & Greedi)

Filmography
2003: (Hollywood Homicide)
2005: (Black Saturday (film))
2007: (Rim Shop)
2008: (Death Toll)
2008: (Block Party Madness)
2010: (Sinners and Saints (2010 film))

References

Hip hop discographies
Discographies of American artists